Bouna Coundoul (born March 4, 1982) is a Senegalese former professional footballer who coaches New Amsterdam FC in the National Independent Soccer Association. Coundoul played as a goalkeeper. Between 2007 and 2016 he represented the Senegal national team.

Youth and college
Born in Dakar, Senegal, Coundoul moved to New York City with his family as a child. He was a standout goalkeeper at Martin Luther King Jr. High School in Manhattan, where he received the All-New York City Goalkeeper of the Year award. Coundoul attended and played for the University at Albany, SUNY.

Club career

Colorado Rapids
In 2005, Coundoul signed with Colorado Rapids, and made his MLS debut on May 13, 2006, as a substitute for injured starter Joe Cannon in the 10th minute. He then earned his first professional start and shutout the next game, in a 1–0 victory over Los Angeles Galaxy on May 20.

In the first game of the 2007 MLS season, at which he arrived wearing traditional Senegalese garb, he contributed to the 2–1 victory over D.C. United with a diving stop in the last minute. In an interview that year, he created his trademark phrase, "Bouna Time!" which grew and spread as a chant in the supporters' sections as well as being promoted by the team.

In January 2009, Coundoul failed to agree terms on a new contract with the Rapids and was released. Coundoul appeared in 52 league matches during his career with Colorado, posting 16 shutouts and a 1.16 goals against average.

New York Red Bulls
On June 29, 2009, New York Red Bulls of Major League Soccer signed Coundoul after acquiring his rights from Colorado in exchange for allocation money. He made his debut for the Red Bulls on July 25, in an away match against his former club Colorado. By the end of the season, Coundoul established himself as New York's first choice keeper and ended the 2009 campaign appearing in 9 league matches posting 2 shutouts and a 1.25 goals against average.

On March 20, 2010, Coundoul started for Red Bulls in a 3–1 victory against Santos FC, which was the first match played at the new Red Bull Arena. On October 2, 2010, Coundoul made a career-high 12 saves in the Red Bulls’ 1–0 victory over the Kansas City Wizards, which clinched a playoff berth for New York and propelled it to first place in the Eastern Conference. The shutout was Coundoul’s 10th of the season, setting a new franchise season record and resulted in Coundoul being named MLS Player of the Week for Week 27. On October 21, 2010, Coundoul recorded his 11th clean sheet of the season in helping Red Bull to a 2–0 victory over New England Revolution which helped the club clinch the regular season Eastern Conference title. Coundoul ended the 2010 campaign appearing in 27 matches, and registering a career-best 1.04 goals against average. He became second choice following the arrival of Frank Rost.

On November 30, 2011, the Red Bulls declined the 2012 option on Coundoul's contract, making him eligible for the 2011 MLS Re-Entry Draft. Coundoul was not selected in the draft and became a free agent.

Europe
Coundoul joined Championship club Doncaster Rovers on a trial in February 2012, but did not sign a contract there.
After a one-week trial with Vaasan Palloseura in the Finnish Veikkausliiga, on March 16, 2012, he signed a short-term deal until July 2012.

Coundoul signed for Enosis Neon Paralimni of Cyprus on August 18, 2012, and July 2013, he signed a two-year contract with Ethnikos Achna of Cyprus.

South Africa
In February 2015 Coundoul signed with South African side Platinum Stars F.C. He signed a three-year extension with the club in June 2015 but retired in summer 2016.

International career
For his performances during the 2007 MLS season, Coundoul was awarded a call-up to the Senegal national football team. On November 23, 2007, he was named to the Senegalese roster for the African Cup of Nations. He was capped in their final game against South Africa after regular goalkeeper Tony Sylva broke curfew and was suspended from the team. The game ended in a 1–1 draw, with Coundoul making several strong saves. After years of being a fringe player for the national team, Coundoul was named to Senegal's squad for the 2012 African Cup of Nations. Coundoul was first-choice goalkeeper for the first two matches of the group stage against Zambia and Equatorial Guinea which both ended in upset defeats for Senegal. For the third and final match of the group stage, Amara Traoré chose Khadim N'Diaye to start in goal over Condoul. With that defeat, Senegal was knocked out of the tournament.

Career statistics

References

External links
 
 stats.cbc.ca
 

1982 births
Living people
Footballers from Dakar
Association football goalkeepers
Senegalese footballers
Senegal international footballers
2008 Africa Cup of Nations players
University at Albany, SUNY alumni
Albany Great Danes men's soccer players
Colorado Rapids players
New York Red Bulls players
Vaasan Palloseura players
Enosis Neon Paralimni FC players
Ethnikos Achna FC players
Major League Soccer players
Veikkausliiga players
Cypriot First Division players
Senegalese expatriate footballers
Senegalese expatriate sportspeople in the United States
Expatriate soccer players in the United States
Expatriate footballers in Finland
Senegalese expatriate sportspeople in Finland
Expatriate footballers in Cyprus
Senegalese expatriate sportspeople in Cyprus
Senegalese expatriate sportspeople in South Africa
Expatriate soccer players in South Africa
2012 Africa Cup of Nations players
2015 Africa Cup of Nations players